A Passage in Time may refer to:

A Passage in Time (Dead Can Dance album), 1991
A Passage in Time (Authority Zero album), 2002
Passage in Time, an album by Quo Vadis, 2001